Droga krajowa nr 32 (translates from Polish as national road 32) is route that is part of the Polish national roads network. It runs through Lubusz and Greater Poland Voivodeships, leading from the former border crossing with Germany in Gubinek to Stęszew, where meets national road 5. Locally act as a bypass for small towns through the route. For a 14 km stretch it runs on the route of expressway S3. National road 32 connects Poznań urban area and Zielona Góra urban area with Polish-German border.

Major towns along the route 
 Gubinek, Polish-German border
 Gubin
 Krosno Odrzańskie
 Dąbie (national road 29)
 Zielona Góra (S3, national road 27)
 Sulechów (S3, national road 3)
 Wolsztyn
 Grodzisk Wielkopolski
 Stęszew (national road 5)

Route plan 

32